Kheyrabad (also Romanized as Kheyrābād) is a village in Rudkhaneh Bar Rural District, Rudkhaneh District, Rudan County, Hormozgan Province, Iran. At the 2006 census, its population was 172, in 34 families.

References 

Populated places in Rudan County